Grevillea viridiflava is a shrub of the family Proteaceae native to New South Wales.

References

viridiflava
Proteales of Australia
Flora of New South Wales
Taxa named by Robert Owen Makinson